A sable is a mammal in the mustelid (weasel) family.

Sable may also refer to:

Animals
 American Sable, an ARBA-recognised rabbit breed
 Sable, a dog coat pattern
 Sable, a ferret coat coloring
 Sable antelope, an antelope which inhabits wooded savanna in Africa
 Sablefish or sable, a white fish also known as the butterfish

Places
Sable Island, an uninhabited island in Nova Scotia

People
Avinash Sable, Indian athlete
Devdatta Sable, Indian music composer
Jean Baptiste Point du Sable, first permanent non-native settler of Chicago area
Mark Sable, American writer
Mia Sable, American actress, voice actress and singer-songwriter
Sable (wrestler) or Rena Greek, professional wrestler
Krishnarao Sable also known as Shahir Sable, Indian folk artist

Fictional characters
Sable (dragon), a dragon in the Dragonlance universe
Sable, a character from the 2017 film, Dragonheart: Battle for the Heartfire, played by Marte Germaine Christensen
Sable Able, an Animal Crossing character
Sable Colby, a character on The Colbys and Dynasty
Sable Knight, a character from Howard Pyle's novel The Story of King Arthur and his Knights written in 1903
Jon Sable, a fictional mercenary and comic book
Silver Sable, a fictional female mercenary from Marvel Comics

Media
Sable (TV series) (1987-1988), a TV drama
Sables (film) ("Sands"), French silent film
Sable (video game), a video game published by Raw Fury

Other uses
SABLE, a markup language for speech synthesis developed by Bell Labs
Sable (heraldry), the colour black in heraldry
USS Sable (IX-81), a US Navy freshwater aircraft carrier
Mercury Sable, an automobile model
Sable, a knife manufactured by Chris Reeve Knives
Kolinsky sable-hair brush, a type of paintbrush often used for watercolor

See also
 Sablé (disambiguation)
 Sabel (disambiguation)
 Samur (disambiguation) - for interwiki links for transliteration of the translation of "Sable" into Turkish, Bulgarian and Romanian
 Sobol (disambiguation) - for interwiki links for transliteration of the translation of "Sable" into Russian, Polish, and Ukrainian
 Zobel (disambiguation) - for interwiki links for transliteration of the translation of "Sable" into German